Mohamed "Mo" Katir El Haouzi (born 17 February 1998) is a Spanish middle- and long-distance runner. He won the bronze medal in the 1500 metres at the 2022 World Athletics Championships. Katir took silver in the 5000 metres at the 2022 European Championships. He is the European indoor record holder for the 3000 metres.

Katir holds also three Spanish records (1500 m, 3000 m, 5000 m) and is a two-time national champion.

Biography
Born in Ksar el-Kebir, Morocco, Mohamed Katir was raised in Mula, Murcia, Spain since he was 5 years old. While Katir had previously run as Spaniard in youth competitions and won a Spanish national cross championship, he actually acquired the Spanish citizenship in October 2019, after a 4-year long process.

In May 2021, Katir won his first Diamond League event, securing victory in the 5000 metres at the Grand Prix Gateshead in United Kingdom. In June and July, he broke three long-standing Spanish national records in just a 33-day span at the Diamond League meetings. First on 10 June, he ran a new 5000 m record of 12:50.79 at the Golden Gala in Florence, Italy. Less than a month later, at the Herculis meet in Monaco, he set Spanish record in the 1500 metres, finishing second behind only 2019 world champion Timothy Cheruiyot who set a personal best in the race. Katir's 3:28.76 ranked him as the 10th fastest of all time, just eight hundreds of a second off the European record. Four days after that, he won the 3000 metres in Gateshead, United Kingdom with a time of 7:27.64, breaking Haile Gebrselassie meet record in the process. His time ranked him as 15th of all time at that distance. At the end of the year, Katir won the San Silvestre Vallecana 10 kilometres road race in Madrid, setting yet another national best mark and becoming the first domestic winner of this race since 2003.

On 15 February 2023, Katir obliterated European indoor 3000 m record at the Meeting Hauts-de-France Pas-de-Calais in Liévin (in a race where Lamecha Girma set a world record) with a time of 7:24.68, slicing more than six seconds off the previous mark held by Adel Mechaal since 2022. His time even surpassed the European outdoor 3000 m record of 7:26.62 and was inside the previous world indoor record of 7:24.90 set by Daniel Komen in 1998.

Achievements

International competitions

Circuit wins, and National titles
 Diamond League
 2021 (5000 m): Gateshead Grand Prix, Gateshead British Grand Prix
 Spanish Athletics Championships
 5000 metres: 2022
 Spanish Indoor Athletics Championships
 3000 metres: 2019

Personal bests
 800 metres – 1:51.84 (Madrid 2019)
 1500 metres – 3:28.76 (Monaco 2021) 
 1500 metres indoor – 3:34.32 (Madrid 2023)
 3000 metres – 7:27.64 (Gateshead 2021) 
 3000 metres indoor – 7:24.68 (Liévin 2023) European record
 5000 metres – 12:50.79 (Florence 2021) 
Road
 5 kilometres – 13:20 (Málaga 2022)
 10 kilometres – 27:19 (Madrid 2022)

References

External links

 
 
 
 

1998 births
Living people
Moroccan emigrants to Spain
Naturalised citizens of Spain
Spanish male middle-distance runners
Spanish male long-distance runners
Spanish sportspeople of Moroccan descent
Athletes (track and field) at the 2020 Summer Olympics
Olympic athletes of Spain
European Athletics Championships medalists
21st-century Spanish people